Heliciopsis is a genus of about thirteen species of trees, constituting part of the flowering plant family Proteaceae. 
They grow naturally in Burma, Indo-China, SE. China, Thailand, Peninsular Malaysia, Borneo, Sumatra, Java (Indonesia) and the Philippines. The name means similar to the plant genus Helicia. Its closest relatives are Athertonia (Australia) and Virotia (New Caledonia).

Species
It includes the following species:
 Heliciopsis artocarpoides 
 Heliciopsis cockburnii 
 Heliciopsis lanceolata 
 Heliciopsis litseifolia 
 Heliciopsis mahmudii 
 Heliciopsis montana 
 Heliciopsis percoriacea 
 Heliciopsis rufidula 
 Heliciopsis velutina 
 Heliciopsis whitmorei

References

 
Proteaceae genera
Taxonomy articles created by Polbot
Indomalayan realm flora